La Linda is a settlement in El Carmen de Viboral Municipality, Antioquia Department in Colombia.

Climate
La Linda has a mild and very wet subtropical highland climate (Köppen Cfb).

References

Populated places in the Antioquia Department